Das Mädchen vom Pfarrhof is a 1955 Austrian Heimatfilm based on a Ludwig Anzengruber's play Der Pfarrer von Kirchfeld and directed by Alfred Lehner.

The film lacks the more controversial themes of the play, such as criticism of celibacy and of the attitude of the Church to suicide and divorce; instead, it takes a more positive outlook, which is characteristic of the Heimatfilme of the period.

A rival West German film version of Anzengruber's play was released two months before Das Mädchen vom Pfarrhof.

Synopsis 
The beautiful, recently orphaned Annerl comes to stay with the young parish priest, Hell, and his housekeeper, Brigitte. Soon, Annerl and the priest find themselves becoming the target of rumors, fuelled by a local named Sepp who is bitter at the Church; this places the priest in a difficult position, and makes Annerl's suitor Michel jealous.

Cast 
 Waltraut Haas as Annerl
 Erich Auer as Fr. Hell
 Franziska Kinz as Brigitte
 Attila Hörbiger as Herr von Finsterberg
 Helene Thimig as Gerberleni, Sepp's mother
 Walter Ladengast as Sepp
 Karl Ehmann as the other priest
 Albert Rueprecht as Michel Berndorfer

References

Further reading

External links 
 
 https://www.filmportal.de/film/das-maedchen-vom-pfarrhof_9d0ea1ede0324696afd26cfeb9e0880d

1955 films
Austrian drama films
Austrian films based on plays
1950s German-language films
Films based on works by Ludwig Anzengruber
Films about Catholic priests
Remakes of Austrian films
Films set in the Alps
Films directed by Alfred Lehner
1955 drama films